The 2015–16 Saint Mary's Gaels men's basketball team represented Saint Mary's College of California during the 2015–16 NCAA Division I men's basketball season. This was head coach Randy Bennett's fifteenth season at Saint Mary's. The Gaels competed in the West Coast Conference and played their home games at the McKeon Pavilion. They finished the season 29–6, 15–3 in WCC play to win a share of the WCC regular season conference championship. They defeated Loyola Marymount and Pepperdine to advance to the championship game of the WCC tournament where they lost to Gonzaga. As a regular season conference champion, and #1 seed in their conference tournament, who failed to win their conference tournament, they received an automatic bid to the National Invitation Tournament. As a #2 seed, they defeated New Mexico State and Georgia to advance to the quarterfinals where they lost to Valparaiso.

Previous season
The Gaels finished the 2014–15 season 21–10, 13–5 in WCC play to finish in a tie for second place. They lost in the quarterfinals of the WCC tournament to Portland. They were invited to the National Invitation Tournament where they lost in the first round to Vanderbilt.

Departures

Recruiting

Roster

Schedule and results

|-
!colspan=9 style="background:#06315B; color:#D80024;"| Regular season

|-
!colspan=9 style="background:#06315B; color:#D80024;"| WCC tournament

|-
!colspan=9 style="background:#06315B; color:#D80024;"| NIT

Rankings

*AP does not release post-NCAA tournament rankings

References

Saint Mary's
Saint Mary's Gaels men's basketball seasons
Saint Mary's